Han Dongyan (born April 1963) is a former Chinese politician who spent most of his career in both cities of Daqing and Qiqihar in northeast China's Heilongjiang province. He was investigated by the Heilongjiang Provincial Surveillance Commission in March 2018. Previously he served as director and deputy party chief of the State-owned Assets Supervision and Administration Commission of Heilongjiang Government.

Early life and education
Han was born in Qing'an County, Heilongjiang in April 1963. After the Cultural Revolution in September 1982, he entered Daqing Petroleum Institute (now Northeast Petroleum University), where he received a Bachelor of Engineering. He completed his doctor's degree in management science and engineering from Harbin Engineering University in 2008.

Career
After graduation in July 1986, he was assigned to Daqing Petroleum Administration Bureau, a state-owned company and a subsidiary of China National Petroleum Corporation (CNPC) responsible for the management of oil where he worked for more than seven years. He assumed various posts there, including trainee, party chief and manager. 

In September 1993 he was promoted to become head of the CPC Daqing Committee Organization Department, a position he held until November 1998. He served as deputy secretary general of Daqing government in February 1998, and five years later promoted to the principal position. In October 2002 he was elected as executive vice-mayor of Daqing, and held that office until February 2008. Then he was transferred to Harbin, capital of Heilongjiang province, and served as deputy secretary general of Heilongjiang government. But having held the position for only two years, he was transferred again to Qiqihar, the second largest city in Heilongjiang province and the political, economic, cultural center of western Heilongjiang, and was appointed deputy party chief, party group chief and mayor of the city. He rose to become party chief, the top political position in the city in June 2012. At the same time, he concurrently served as director of Qiqihar Municipal People's Congress. In June 2016, he was installed as director and deputy party chief of the State-owned Assets Supervision and Administration Commission of Heilongjiang Government.

Investigation
On March 23, 2018, Han was placed under investigation by the Heilongjiang Provincial Surveillance Commission. On September 8, he was expelled from the Chinese Communist Party (CCP) and dismissed from public office.

References

External links

1963 births
Northeast Petroleum University alumni
Harbin Engineering University alumni
Living people
People's Republic of China politicians from Heilongjiang
Chinese Communist Party politicians from Heilongjiang